Zack O'Malley Greenburg (born March 8, 1985, New York City) is an American writer, journalist and former child-actor. He is a senior editor at Forbes magazine, where he covers music, media and entertainment. He is also the author of three books:  3 Kings: Diddy, Dr. Dre, Jay-Z and Hip-Hop's Multibillion-Dollar Rise (Little, Brown, 2018); Michael Jackson, Inc.: The Rise, Fall and Rebirth of a Billion-Dollar Empire (Atria/Simon & Schuster, 2014); and Empire State of Mind: How Jay-Z Went From Street Corner to Corner Office (Penguin/Portfolio, 2011). He has a fourth book in progress, A-List Angels: How a Band of Actors, Artists, and Athletes Hacked Silicon Valley (Little, Brown, 2020). He played Lorenzo Odone in the 1992 film Lorenzo's Oil.

Professional life
Greenburg's first writing job was reviewing video games at Boys' Life magazine at the age of 14. While at Yale, he wrote extensively for the Yale Daily News as a varsity baseball beat reporter, sports columnist, and scene (arts and living) writer. A feature he authored on a varsity outfielder who had returned to the field after nearly dying in a car crash won him an AP award his senior year.

He has written more than 1,000 articles for Forbes, Forbes Asia, and Forbes.com. He has profiled such influential figures as Ashton Kutcher, Katy Perry, Bruno Mars, Diddy, Kendrick Lamar, Alex Rodriguez, 50 Cent, Toby Keith, Steve Wozniak, Alicia Keys, Swizz Beatz, Dr. Ruth, and Richard Branson.

He has written for The New York Times, The Washington Post, Billboard, McSweeney's, and other news outlets. He has also served as an expert source for CNBC, BBC, Bloomberg, Reuters, NPR, and other print, web, radio, and video outlets.

Personal life
Both of Greenburg's parents are authors: his father, Dan Greenburg, authored the series The Zack Files and his mother, Suzanne O'Malley, is a former television writer (Law & Order) and the author of a book on Andrea Yates.

A former child actor, Zack played the title role in the film Lorenzo's Oil, alongside Nick Nolte and Susan Sarandon. He moved from New York to Hastings-on-Hudson, New York, and  graduated from Hastings High School in 2003. Greenburg graduated from Yale College with a degree in American Studies and a concentration in Urban Studies, and started writing for Forbes magazine in 2007.

Books

References

External links
Zack O'Malley Greenburg profile, Goodreads.com; accessed February 2, 2017.

Living people
1985 births
American biographers
American male biographers
American business and financial journalists
American male journalists
Yale College alumni
American male child actors
Writers from New York (state)